The 2016–17 Iowa State Cyclones women's basketball team represented Iowa State University in the 2016–17 NCAA Division I women's basketball season. This was head coach Bill Fennelly's 22nd season at Iowa State. The Cyclones are members of the Big 12 Conference and played their home games at the Hilton Coliseum. They finished the season 18–13, 9–9 in Big 12 play to finish in fifth place. They lost in the quarterfinals of the Big 12 women's tournament to Kansas State. They received an at-large bid to the NCAA women's tournament where they lost to Syracuse in the first round.

Radio
All Cyclones games were carried on the Iowa State Cyclone Radio Network. Not all affiliates carried women's basketball, and some affiliates only carried select games. To learn which stations will carry games, please visit the Cyclone Radio Network affiliate list linked here. Brent Blum and Molly Parrott called all the action for the Cyclone Radio Network and for games on Cyclones.tv.

Roster

Schedule and results

|-
!colspan=9 style="background:#840A2C; color:#FEC938;"| Exhibition

|-
!colspan=9 style="background:#840A2C; color:#FEC938;"| Non-conference regular season

|-
!colspan=9 style="background:#840A2C; color:#FEC938;"| Big 12 Conference Season

|-
!colspan=9 style="background:#840A2C; color:#FEC938;"| Big 12 Women's Tournament

|-
!colspan=9 style="background:#840A2C; color:#FEC938;"| NCAA tournament

Rankings
2016–17 NCAA Division I women's basketball rankings

See also
 2016–17 Iowa State Cyclones men's basketball team

References

Iowa State Cyclones women's basketball seasons
Iowa State
Iowa State
Iowa State Cyc
Iowa State Cyc